John Sudworth is a British journalist. He was previously the Beijing correspondent for the British Broadcasting Corporation (BBC) and is currently a North American correspondent for the network. He had lived and worked in China for nine years. His wife, Yvonne Murray, is a reporter for the Irish public broadcaster RTÉ. In 2017, Sudworth and his camera crew were attacked and forced to sign a confession in a Chinese village. In 2020, Sudworth won a George Polk Award for his reporting on the Xinjiang internment camps. After suffering pressure and threats from the Chinese government, he left Beijing and moved to Taipei with his wife and three young children in March 2021.

References

External links 
 

Living people
Year of birth missing (living people)
BBC newsreaders and journalists
British journalists
20th-century British journalists
21st-century British journalists
George Polk Award recipients